Lessay is a commune in the Manche department in north-western France. On 1 January 2016, the former commune of Angoville-sur-Ay was merged into Lessay.

Geography
Lessay is a small town in the centre of the Cotentin Peninsula, Normandy.

History
It was founded as a monastery but a town grew up around it over the years. The 10th-century Lessay Abbey is one of the greatest examples of Romanesque architecture in Normandy. It was largely destroyed by fighting in the town during July–August 1944, but has been rebuilt.

Heraldry

Points of interest
 LORAN-C transmitter Lessay
 La Foire: the Sainte Croix fair of Lessay is a trade fair established in the 11th century in order to develop commercial activity in the village. For three days in the second week of September,  of Lessay is transformed into a marketplace, attracting over 400,000 visitors.  The fair offers demonstrations of old and new trades, thousands of stalls selling a range of products from household equipment to animals, food, cars and garden and agricultural tools.
 Lessay was the location for the studio for English language commercial radio station Contact 94 which was aimed at the Channel Islands before they had commercial radio of their own. The station launched on 5 September 1988 and closed in 1991.

See also
Communes of the Manche department

References

Communes of Manche